Fabriciidae is a family of annelid worm in the class Polychaeta.

Genera 
Genera within Fabriciidae include:

 Augeneriella Banse, 1957
 Bansella Fitzhugh, 2010
 Brandtika Jones, 1974
 Brifacia Fitzhugh, 1998
 Echinofabricia Huang, Fitzhugh & Rouse, 2011
 Fabricia Blainville, 1828
 Fabricinuda Fitzhugh, 1990
 Fabriciola Friedrich, 1939
 Leiobranchus Quatrefages, 1850
 Leptochone
 Manayunkia Leidy, 1859
 Monroika Hartman, 1951
 Novafabricia Fitzhugh, 1990
 Parafabricia Fitzhugh, 1992
 Pseudoaugeneriella Fitzhugh, 1998
 Pseudofabricia Cantone, 1972
 Pseudofabriciola Fitzhugh, 1990
 Raficiba Fitzhugh, 2001
 Rubifabriciola Huang, Fitzhugh & Rouse, 2011
 Tuba Renier, 1804

Genera brought into synonymy:
 Amphicora Ehrenberg, 1836 accepted as Fabricia Blainville, 1828 (subjective synonym)
 Eriographis Grube, 1850 accepted as Myxicola Koch in Renier, 1847 (subjective synonym)
 Haplobranchus Bourne, 1883 accepted as Manayunkia Leidy, 1859 (objective synonymy (type species))
 Oridia Rioja, 1917 accepted as Amphicorina Claparède, 1864 (replaced junior homonym, invalid replacement name for Oria)

References 

Sabellida
Annelid families